Herr is an unincorporated community in Perry Township, Boone County, in the U.S. state of Indiana.

Geography

References

Unincorporated communities in Boone County, Indiana
Unincorporated communities in Indiana
Indianapolis metropolitan area